Linnar Priimägi (born 29 March 1954 in Tallinn) is an Estonian art historian, journalist, literary critic, poet and actor.

He graduated from Tartu State University in philology, Estonian Academy of Arts (master's thesis) and Tallinn University (doctoral's thesis).

Priimägi is a docent at Tallinn University. He has taught German language, art history and theory of literary criticism at the University of Tartu, history of philosophy at the Estonian Academy of Music and Theatre, and cultural history at Tallinn Pedagogical University and Tallinn University.

Filmography
 1973 "Tavatu lugu" (role: class organizator)
 1980 "Jõulud Vigalas" (role: baron Uexküll)
 1997 "Minu Leninid" (role: Romberg, German ambassador)
 2007 "Jan Uuspõld läheb Tartusse" (role: philologist Linnar)
 2009 "Mis su nimi on?" (role: Linnar Priimägi)
 2017 "November" (role: kratt Joosep (voice))

References

Living people
1954 births
Estonian journalists
Estonian literary critics
Estonian art historians
Estonian educators
Estonian male poets
20th-century Estonian poets
21st-century Estonian poets
Estonian male stage actors
Estonian male film actors
University of Tartu alumni
Estonian Academy of Arts alumni
Tallinn University alumni
Academic staff of the University of Tartu
Academic staff of the Estonian Academy of Music and Theatre
Academic staff of Tallinn University
Writers from Tallinn
Male actors from Tallinn